Academic Music College, fully Tchaikovsky Academic Music College at the Moscow State Conservatory is an educational institution located in Moscow, Russia.

History
Founded in 1891 as Public Music College by pianist , the college was given the name of and an official attachment to the Moscow Conservatory in 1936.

Overview
Academic Music College's full graduate program lasts four years. Entry exams are normally held for students age 15, although students from the vocal department are usually older. Its diploma gives graduates the right to work professionally as teachers, orchestra players, conductors, operatic and choir soloists. The Academic Music College can also be considered a preparatory stage for further advancement in higher education institutions such as conservatories and universities. In that capacity, the college serves as an intermediary educational body. The college also has its own junior division, Music School.

In musical circles, Academic Music College is often informally called Merzliakov College, or simply Merzliakovka, after the street on which it is located.

Notable alumni
 Valery Afanassiev (b. 1947), pianist, writer and conductor
 Andrei Eshpai (1925–2015), composer, People's Artist of the USSR
 Dmitry Kabalevsky (1904–1987), composer and teacher
 Vladimir Landsman (b. 1941), Soviet-Canadian violinist and teacher
 Roman Moiseyev (b. 1960), conductor
 Natasha Paremski (b. 1987), Russian-American classical pianist
 Viktor Tretiakov (b. 1946), violinist and conductor
 Arcadi Volodos (b. 1972), pianist

References

External links
Official website (in English and Russian)

Universities and colleges in Moscow
Moscow Conservatory
Music schools in Russia
1891 establishments in the Russian Empire
Educational institutions established in 1891